The Mount Vernon, IL Micropolitan Statistical Area, as defined by the United States Census Bureau, is an area consisting of two counties in southern Illinois, anchored by the city of Mount Vernon.

As of the 2010 census, this micropolitan statistical area had a population of 47,284, a decline of 1,382 from  the 2000 census count of 48,666.

Counties
Hamilton
Jefferson

Communities
Places with more than 10,000 inhabitants
Centralia (partial)
Mount Vernon (Principal city)
Places with 1,000 to 5,000 inhabitants
Ina
McLeansboro
Places with 500 to 1,000 inhabitants
Bluford
Dahlgren
Woodlawn
Places with less than 500 inhabitants
Belle Prairie City
Belle Rive
Bonnie
Broughton
Dale (Dales)
Dix
Macedonia (partial)
Nason
Waltonville

Unincorporated places Hamilton County
Aden
Blairsville (Flannigan's Store)
Braden
Bungay
Delafield
Diamond City
Feakeyville
Flint (ghost town)
Garrison
Hoodville
Jefferson City, IL (ghost town near Bungay)
Logansport, IL
Lovilla (ghost town, see Dahlgren)
Olga
Piopolis (New Bremen)
Rectorville (moved to/became Broughton)
Slapout (ghost town)
Thackeray
Thurber
Tucker's Corner
Walpole

Unincorporated places Jefferson County
Bakerville
Boyd
Camp Ground
Divide
Drivers
Marcoe
Marlow
Miller Lake
Opdyke
Idlewood
Roaches
Summersville
Texico

Townships

Hamilton County

 Beaver Creek Township
 Crook Township
 Crouch Township
 Dahlgren Township
 Flannigan Township
 Knights Prairie Township

 Mayberry Township
 McLeansboro Township
 South Crouch Township
 South Flannigan Township
 South Twigg Township
 Twigg Township

Jefferson County

 Bald Hill Township
 Blissville Township
 Casner Township
 Dodds Township
 Elk Prairie Township
 Farrington Township
 Field Township
 Grand Prairie Township

 McClellan Township
 Moore's Prairie Township
 Mt. Vernon Township
 Pendleton Township
 Rome Township
 Shiloh Township
 Spring Garden Township
 Webber Township

Demographics
As of the census of 2000, there were 48,666 people, 18,836 households, and 12,998 families residing within the μSA. The racial makeup of the μSA was 91.36% White, 6.56% African American, 0.22% Native American, 0.41% Asian, 0.01% Pacific Islander, 0.39% from other races, and 1.05% from two or more races. Hispanic or Latino of any race were 1.20% of the population.

The median income for a household in the μSA was $32,026, and the median income for a family was $39,396. Males had a median income of $32,977 versus $19,496 for females. The per capita income for the μSA was $16,453.

See also
Illinois statistical areas

References

 
Geography of Hamilton County, Illinois
Geography of Jefferson County, Illinois
Micropolitan areas of Illinois